Mont Brulé (also known as Mont Brûlé or Mont Braoulé) is a mountain of the Pennine Alps, located on the Swiss-Italian border, east of the Col Collon. On its northern side it overlooks the upper Arolla Glacier.

Toponym
Though in French this name means "burnt mountain", this toponym comes from Valdôtain Francoprovençal patois. According to Aostan botanist and scientist Joseph-Marie Henry, the word Broillà means "made of breuils", Breuil meaning alpine marshy berm, as for Breuil in Valtournenche.

References

External links
 Mont Brulé on Hikr

Mountains of the Alps
Alpine three-thousanders
Mountains of Valais
Mountains of Aosta Valley
Italy–Switzerland border
Mountains of Switzerland